Transmembrane protein 49 is a protein that in humans is encoded by the TMEM49 gene.

References

Further reading